The Kid Stays in the Picture is a 1994 print autobiography by film producer Robert Evans.  A film adaptation of the book was released in 2002.

The title comes from a line attributed to studio head Darryl F. Zanuck, who was defending Evans after some of the actors involved in the film The Sun Also Rises (1957) had recommended he be removed from the cast.

The film adaptation was directed by Nanette Burstein and Brett Morgen and released by USA Films. It was screened out of competition at the 2002 Cannes Film Festival.

Synopsis

Book

The book chronicles Evans' rise from childhood to radio star to film actor to production chief of Paramount Pictures to independent producer, his marriage to Ali MacGraw, his downfall including his 1980 cocaine bust and implication in the murder of Roy Radin, aka "The Cotton Club Murder", his banishment from Paramount Pictures, and his return to the studio in the early 1990s.

The audiobook version was read by Evans himself, with (presumably impromptu) additions.

A revised edition of the book, published in 1995, adds several chapters of new material, including material on his projects after his return to Paramount Pictures.

Film

The film version, released in 2002, uses Evans' narration interspersed mostly with photographs from Evans' life as well as brief film footage from films such as Love Story, The Sun Also Rises, Rosemary's Baby, Chinatown, and The Godfather, along with interviews to tell the story from his discovery by Norma Shearer for Man of a Thousand Faces (1957) to his return to Paramount Pictures.

According to the commentary by directors Burstein and Morgen on the DVD, many elements from the book, such as Evans' childhood and his other marriages (the film concentrates only on his marriage to Ali MacGraw), were dropped because they felt they did not move the story along.

Critical response

On review aggregator Rotten Tomatoes, the film holds an approval rating of 91% based on 112 reviews, with an average rating of 7.69/10. The website's critical consensus reads, "Though not objective by any means, The Kid Stays in the Picture is irresistibly entertaining."

Stage production
An adaptation of the book—along with material from a further, unpublished volume of Evans' memoirs—for the Broadway stage was announced in 2010, to be written by Jon Robin Baitz and directed by Richard Eyre, but the production was canceled in 2011.

Another stage adaptation of the book was first performed at the Royal Court Theatre in London in 2017. It was adapted by the Complicite theatre company and directed by Simon McBurney. The cast included Danny Huston, son of John Huston, who worked with Evans on Chinatown in 1974.

In popular culture
The film version was parodied in the IFC series Documentary Now! with Bill Hader as Jerry Wallach.

Robert Evans and his book appear in Moby's "We Are All Made of Stars" videoclip.

References

External links
 
 Review of The Kid Stays In The Picture
  DVD Verdict review
 DVD Talk review
 
 

2002 films
2002 documentary films
American documentary films
Documentary films about film directors and producers
Works about the history of Hollywood, Los Angeles
Autobiographies adapted into films
Show business memoirs
Collage film
Non-fiction books about film directors and producers
Films directed by Nanette Burstein
Films directed by Brett Morgen
Films produced by Graydon Carter
Films scored by Jeff Danna
Cultural depictions of Robert Evans
2000s English-language films
2000s American films